This is a list of writings and other compositions by Friedrich Nietzsche.

Works by Nietzsche

Writings and philosophy
Aus meinem Leben, 1858 (From My Life)
Über Musik, 1858 (On Music)
Napoleon III als Praesident, 1862 (Napoleon III as President)
Fatum und Geschichte, 1862 (Fate and History)
Willensfreiheit und Fatum, 1862 (Freedom of Will and Fate)
Kann der Neidische je wahrhaft glücklich sein?, 1863 (Can the Envious Ever Be Truly Happy?)
Über Stimmungen, 1864 (On Moods)
Mein Leben, 1864 (My Life)
Homer und die klassische Philologie, 1868 (Homer and the Classical Philology)
Über die Zukunft unserer Bildungsanstalten, 1872 (On the Future of our Educational Institutions)
Fünf Vorreden zu fünf ungeschriebenen Büchern, 1872 (Five Prefaces on Five Unwritten Books) comprising:
 Über das Pathos der Wahrheit (On the Pathos of Truth)
 Gedanken über die Zukunft unserer Bildungsanstalten (Thoughts on the Future of Our Educational Institutions)
 Der griechische Staat (The Greek State)
 Das Verhältnis der Schopenhauerischen Philosophie zu einer deutschen Cultur (The Relation between a Schopenhauerian Philosophy and a German Culture)
 Homers Wettkampf (Homer's Contest)
 Die Geburt der Tragödie, 1872 (The Birth of Tragedy)
 Über Wahrheit und Lüge im außermoralischen Sinn, 1873 (On Truth and Lies in a Nonmoral Sense)
 Die Philosophie im tragischen Zeitalter der Griechen (Philosophy in the Tragic Age of the Greeks)
 Unzeitgemässe Betrachtungen (Untimely Meditations) comprising:
 David Strauss: der Bekenner und der Schriftsteller, 1873 (David Strauss: the Confessor and the Writer)
 Vom Nutzen und Nachtheil der Historie für das Leben, 1874 (On the Use and Abuse of History for Life)
 Schopenhauer als Erzieher, 1874 (Schopenhauer as Educator)
 Richard Wagner in Bayreuth, 1876
 Menschliches, Allzumenschliches,  1878 (Human, All-Too-Human)
 Vermischte Meinungen und Sprüche, 1879 (Mixed Opinions and Maxims; usually treated as the second part of Menschliches, Allzumenschliches)
 Der Wanderer und sein Schatten, 1880 (The Wanderer and His Shadow; usually treated as the third part of Menschliches, Allzumenschliches)
 Morgenröte, 1881 (The Dawn)
 Die fröhliche Wissenschaft, 1882, 1887 (The Gay Science)
 Also sprach Zarathustra, 1883-5 (Thus Spoke Zarathustra)
 Jenseits von Gut und Böse, 1886 (Beyond Good and Evil)
 Zur Genealogie der Moral, 1887 (On the Genealogy of Morality)
 Der Fall Wagner, 1888 (The Case of Wagner)
 Götzen-Dämmerung, 1888 (The Twilight of the Idols)
 Der Antichrist, 1888 (The Antichrist)
 Ecce Homo, 1888
 Nietzsche contra Wagner, 1888
 Der Wille zur Macht, first published 1901 (The Will to Power, a posthumous and selective collection of notes arranged by his sister, which are not necessarily representative of Nietzsche)

Major English translations

The Greek Music Drama, 1870
 The Greek Music Drama, trans. Paul Bishop, intro by Jill Marsden. Contra Mundum Press, 2013,

The Birth of Tragedy, 1872
 in: 'Basic Writings of Nietzsche', trans. Walter Kaufmann, Modern Library, 2000, 
 in: 'The Birth of Tragedy and Other Writings', trans. Ronald Speirs, Cambridge University Press, 1999,  (also contains: 'The Dionysiac World View' and 'On Truth and Lying in a Non-Moral Sense')
 in: 'The Birth of Tragedy and the Case of Wagner', trans. Walter Kaufmann, Vintage, 1967, 
 in: 'The Birth of Tragedy & the Genealogy of Morals', trans. Francis Golffing, Anchor Books, 1956, 
 trans. Shaun Whiteside, Penguin Classics, 1994,

The Untimely Meditations, 1873–6
 trans. R. J. Hollingdale, Cambridge University Press, 1997, 
 as: 'Unfashionable Observations', trans. Richard T. Gray, Stanford University Press, 1998,

Human, All Too Human, 1878
 trans. R. J. Hollingdale, Cambridge University Press, 1996,  (also contains: 'Mixed Opinions and Maxims', 1879 and 'The Wanderer and His Shadow', 1880)
as 'Human, All Too Human I', trans. Gary Handwerk, Stanford University Press, 2000, 
as 'Human, All Too Human II and Unpublished Fragments from the Period of Human, All Too Human (Spring I878- Fall I879)', trans. Gary Handwerk, Stanford University Press, 2012,  (also contains: 'Mixed Opinions and Maxims', 1879 and 'The Wanderer and His Shadow', 1880)

The Dawn, 1881
 as: 'Daybreak', trans. R. J. Hollingdale, Cambridge University Press, 1997, 
 as: 'Dawn', trans. Brittain Smith, Stanford University Press, 2011,

The Gay Science, 1882, 1887
 trans. Walter Kaufmann, Vintage, 1974, 
 ed. Bernard Williams, trans. Josefine Nauckhoff and Adrian Del Caro, Cambridge University Press, 2001, 
 as: 'The Joyous Science', trans. R. Kevin Hill, Penguin Random House, 2018,

Thus Spoke Zarathustra, 1883–5
 trans. R. J. Hollingdale, Penguin, 1961, 
 in: 'The Portable Nietzsche', trans. Walter Kaufmann, Penguin, 1977, 
 trans. Adrián del Caro, Cambridge University Press, 2006, 
 trans. Graham Parkes, Oxford University Press, 2005,

Beyond Good and Evil, 1886
 trans. R. J. Hollingdale, Penguin Classics, 1973, 
 in: 'Basic Writings of Nietzsche', trans. Walter Kaufmann, Modern Library, 2000, 
 trans. Judith Norman, Cambridge University Press, 2001, 
 in: 'Beyond Good and Evil / On the Genealogy of Morality', trans. Adrian Del Caro, Stanford University Press, 2014,

On the Genealogy of Morals, 1887
 in: 'The Birth of Tragedy & the Genealogy of Morals', trans. Francis Golffing, Anchor Books, 1956, 
 in: 'Basic Writings of Nietzsche', trans. Walter Kaufmann, Modern Library, 2000, 
 in: 'On the Genealogy of Morals and Ecce Homo', trans. Walter Kaufmann and R. J. Hollingdale, Vintage, 1989, 
 in: 'On the Genealogy of Morality and Other Writings', trans. Carol Diethe, Cambridge University Press, 1994,  (also contains: 'The Greek State', 1872 and 'Homer on Competition', 1872)
 as 'On the Genealogy of Morals', trans. Douglas Smith, Oxford University Press, 1996,  (paperback)
 as 'On the Genealogy of Morality', trans. Maudemarie Clark and Alan J. Swensen, Hackett Publishing Company, 1998, 
 in: 'Beyond Good and Evil / On the Genealogy of Morality', trans. Adrian Del Caro, Stanford University Press, 2014,

The Case of Wagner, 1888
 in: 'Basic Writings of Nietzsche', trans. Walter Kaufmann, Modern Library, 2000, 
 in: 'The Birth of Tragedy and the Case of Wagner', trans. Walter Kaufmann, Vintage, 1967, 
 in: 'The Anti-Christ, Ecce Homo, Twilight of the Idols and Other Writings', trans. Judith Norman, Cambridge University Press, 2005,  (also contains: 'The Case of Wagner', 1888 and 'Nietzsche contra Wagner', 1888)

Twilight of the Idols, 1888
 in: 'The Portable Nietzsche', trans. Walter Kaufmann, Penguin, 1977, 
 trans. Richard Polt, Hackett Publishing Company, 1997, 
 in: 'Twilight of the Idols and the Anti-Christ', trans. R. J. Hollingdale, Penguin Classics, 1990, 
 in: 'The Anti-Christ, Ecce Homo, Twilight of the Idols and Other Writings', trans. Judith Norman, Cambridge University Press, 2005,  (also contains: 'The Case of Wagner', 1888 and 'Nietzsche contra Wagner', 1888)
 trans. Duncan Large, Oxford World's Classics, Oxford University Press, 1998, 
Twilight of the Idols or How to Philosophize with a Hammer. Translation by Daniel Fidel Ferrer (2013). Free online. Also, Includes letters and notes about Twilight of the Idols by Nietzsche.

The Antichrist, 1888
 in: 'Twilight of the Idols and the Anti-Christ', trans. R. J. Hollingdale, Penguin Classics, 1990, 
 in: 'The Portable Nietzsche', trans. Walter Kaufmann, Penguin, 1977, 
 in: 'The Anti-Christ, Ecce Homo, Twilight of the Idols and Other Writings', trans. Judith Norman, Cambridge University Press, 2005,  (also contains: 'The Case of Wagner', 1888 and 'Nietzsche contra Wagner', 1888)
 as 'The Anti-Christ', trans. H. L. Mencken, See Sharp Press, 1999, 
 trans. Anthony M. Ludovici, Prometheus Books, 2000,

Ecce Homo, 1888
 trans. R. J. Hollingdale, Penguin Books, 1993, 
 in: 'Basic Writings of Nietzsche', trans. Walter Kaufmann, Modern Library, 2000, 
 in: 'The Anti-Christ, Ecce Homo, Twilight of the Idols and Other Writings', trans. Judith Norman, Cambridge University Press, 2005,  (also contains: 'The Case of Wagner', 1888 and 'Nietzsche contra Wagner', 1888)
 trans. Duncan Large, Oxford World's Classics, Oxford University Press, 2007,

Nietzsche contra Wagner, 1888
 in: 'The Portable Nietzsche', trans. Walter Kaufmann, Penguin, 1977, 
 in: 'The Anti-Christ, Ecce Homo, Twilight of the Idols and Other Writings', trans. Judith Norman, Cambridge University Press, 2005,  (also contains: 'The Case of Wagner', 1888 and 'Nietzsche contra Wagner', 1888)

The Will to Power and other posthumous collections
 The Will to Power, ed. and trans. Walter Kaufmann, Vintage, 1968, 
 Writings from the Late Notebooks, ed. Rüdiger Bittner, Cambridge University Press, 2003, 
 Philosophy and Truth: Selections from Nietzsche's Notebooks of the Early 1870s, ed. and trans. Daniel Breazeale, Prometheus Books, 1990, 
 Philosophy in the Tragic Age of the Greeks, trans. Marianne Cowan, Regnery Publishing, 1996, 
 The Pre-Platonic Philosophers, trans. Greg Whitlock, University of Illinois Press, 2001, 
 
 Nietzsche’s notebook of 1881: The Eternal Return of the Same. July 2021.  Translation by Daniel Fidel Ferrer. Free online. 
Nietzsche's Last Notebooks 1888-1889. June 2012.  Translation by Daniel Fidel Ferrer. Free online. 
 Nietzsche's Notebook of 1887-1888. June 2012. Translation by Daniel Fidel Ferrer. Free online. 
Nietzsche’s Lenzer Heide Notes on European Nihilism. July 2020. Translation and essays by Daniel Fidel Ferrer. Free online.
Nietzsche’s seven notebooks from 1876. 2020. Translation by Daniel Fidel Ferrer. Free online.
Nietzsche’s Last Twenty Two Notebooks: complete [1886-1889]  January 2021. Translation by Daniel Fidel Ferrer. Free online.
 , five lectures given in 1872.
Unpublished Writings from the Period of Unfashionable Observations, The Complete Works of Friedrich Nietzsche. vol. 11. Translation. Richard T. Gray.  (Stanford, California: Stanford University Press, 1999). 
Unpublished Fragments from the Period of Thus Spoke Zarathustra (Summer 1882–Winter 1883/84). The Complete Works of Friedrich Nietzsche.  (Stanford, California: Stanford University Press, 2019). 
Unpublished Fragments (Spring 1885-Spring 1886). The Complete Works of Friedrich Nietzsche.  (Stanford, California: Stanford University Press, 2019).  
Writings from the Early Notebooks. Cambridge University Press, 2009.

Philology
 Analecta Laertiana (1870)
 Beitrage zur Quellenkunde und Kritik des Laertius Diogenes (1870)
 De Fontibus Diogenis Laertii ("On the Sources of Diogenes Laertius"; Part I: 1868, Part II: 1869)
 Über die alten hexametrischen Nomen    
 Über die Apophthegmata und ihre Sammler
 Über die literarhistorischen Quellen des Suidas   
 Über die Quellen der Lexikographen

Poetry
 Idyllen aus Messina written 1882 (Idylls from Messina)
 Dionysos-Dithyramben, written 1888, published 1892 (Dionysian-Dithyrambs)
 The Peacock and the Buffalo: The Poetry of Nietzsche, Published July 8, 2010
Dionysus-Dithyrambs
Nietzsche’s Last Twenty Two Notebooks: complete [1886-1889]  January 2021. Translation by Daniel Fidel Ferrer. Free online.  See notebook number 20, there are 168 notes and are almost all poems or poem fragments. 20 [1-168] summer 1888 (Pages: 897-944). Note the German title: 20 = W II 10a. Sommer 1888. Octave booklet. Binding: black cover. Red color cut on all sides. 212 pages. Dating from December 1888 to early January 1889. Written by Nietzsche about halfway; partly from front to back, partly from back to front.

Music
This is not a complete list. A title not dated was composed during the same year as the title preceding it. Further information for many of the works listed below may be found at this site annotated within the time of their composition and this site (both depict Nietzsche's musical thought and development). Most pieces available for listening are excerpts.
Allegretto, for piano, before 1858, listen
Hoch tut euch auf, chorus, December 1858
Einleitung (trans: Introduction), piano duet
Phantasie, piano duet, December 1859
Miserere, chorus for 5 voices, summer 1860
Einleitung (or: Entwürfe zu einem Weihnachtsoratorium), oratorio on piano, December 1861
Hüter, ist die Nacht bald hin?, chorus (in fragments)
Presto, piano duet
Overture for Strings (?)
Aus der Tiefe rufe ich (?)
String Quartet Piece (?)
Schmerz ist der Grundton der Natur (?)
Einleitung, orchestral overture for piano
Mein Platz vor der Tur, NWV 1, solo voice and piano, autumn 1861, listen
Heldenklage, piano, 1862
Klavierstuck, piano
Ungarischer Marsch, piano
Zigeunertanz, piano
Edes titok (or: Still und ergeben), piano
Aus der Jugendzeit, NWV 8, solo voice and piano, summer 1862, listen
So lach doch mal, piano, August 1862
Da geht ein Bach, NWV 10b, listen
Im Mondschein auf der Puszta, piano, September 1862
Ermanarich, piano, September 1862
Mazurka, piano, November 1862
Aus der Czarda, piano, November 1862, listen
Das zerbrochene Ringlein, NWV 14, May 1863, listen
Albumblatt, piano, August 1863
Wie sich Rebenranken schwingen, NWV 16, summer 1863, voice and piano, listen
Nachlang einer Sylvestenacht, duet for violin and piano, January 2, 1864, listen
Beschwörung, NWV 20, listen
Nachspiel, NWV 21, listen
Ständchen, NWV 22
Unendlich, NWV 23, listen
Verwelkt, NWV 24, listen
Ungewitter, NWV 25, 1864, listen
Gern und gerner, NWV 26, listen
Das Kind an die erloschene Kerze, NWV 27, listen
Es winkt und neigt sich, NWV 28, listen
Die junge Fischerin, NWV 29, voice and piano, June 1865, listen
O weint um sie, choir and piano, December 1865
Herbstlich sonnige Tage, piano and 4 voices, April 1867
Adel Ich muss nun gehen, 4 voices, August 1870
Das "Fragment an sich", piano, October 1871
Kirchengeschichtliches Responsorium, chorus and piano, November 1871
Manfred-Meditation, 1872, final ver. 1877, listen
Monodie à deux (or: Lob der Barmherzigkeit), piano, February 1873
Hymnus an die Freundschaft (trans: Hymn to Friendship; also: Festzug der Freunde zum Tempel der Freundschaft, trans: Festival of Friends at the Temple of Friendship), piano, December 29, 1874, listen
Gebet an das Leben (trans: Prayer to Life), NWV 41, solo voice and piano, 1882, text by Lou Andreas-Salome, listen
Hymnus an das Leben (trans: Hymn to Life), chorus and orchestra, summer 1887

Other
Thoughts Out of Season, Part 1 is edited by Oscar Levy and translated by Anthony M. Ludovici.  It was published in 1909 by T. N. Foulis, 13 & 15 Frederick St., Edinburgh and London.  It is available on the WWW at Thoughts Out of Season Part One.  It contains David Strauss, the Confessor and the Writer and Richard Wagner in Bayreuth.

C.G. Jung cites this as his first introduction to Nietzsche in his autobiography Memories, Dreams, Reflections (1989, page 102), and claims to have been 'carried away by its enthusiasm'.

See also
List of works about Friedrich Nietzsche

References

 Nietzsche: A Selected Annotated Bibliography

Bibliographies by writer
 
Bibliographies of German writers
Philosophy bibliographies